The Dart Center for Journalism and Trauma is a resource center and think tank for journalists who cover violence, conflict and tragedy around the world. A project of the Columbia University Graduate School of Journalism in New York City, the Dart Center also operates Dart Centre Europe, based in London; Dart Centre Asia Pacific, based in Melbourne; and a research node at the University of Tulsa. The Dart Center's mission is to improve the quality of journalism on traumatic events, while also raising awareness in newsrooms of the impact such coverage has on the journalists telling the stories.

The Dart Center has conducted seminars, training and support programs for journalists covering the attacks of September 11, 2001, Hurricane Katrina, the Boxing Day tsunami, the Troubles in Northern Ireland, the Iraq War and the Virginia Tech shootings, among other events. The Dart Center's director is the American journalist Bruce Shapiro.

History and programs 
The Dart Center for Journalism and Trauma was founded at the University of Washington in 1999 to nurture innovation in ethical reporting on victims of violence and tragedy. Among its founders were Roger Simpson, a professor of communication at UW and the center's director until 2006, and Frank Ochberg, a psychiatrist and authority on post traumatic stress disorder. It was named for its principal funder, the Dart Foundation. The Dart Center re-located to Columbia University in the spring of 2009.

Among the Dart Center's programs are the annual Dart Center Awards for Excellence in Reporting on Trauma (given annually since 1994) and the fellowship program, called after one of its founders Frank Ochberg which is aimed at mid career journalists who want to deepen their knowledge of emotional trauma and improve coverage of violence, conflict and tragedy, among whom six to ten journalists are selected every year to attend an intensive weeklong seminar program, including discussions with journalist colleagues, and the annual conference of the International Society for Traumatic Stress Studies. As of November 2008, 80 journalists—from 19 states and seven nations—had been selected for Dart Center Ochberg Fellowship.

The Dart Center has also encouraged and led research on the psychological impact of reporting traumatic events on journalists, and encouraged the development of training and support programs at leading news organizations. Its affiliate Dart Centre in Europe has developed programs for the BBC and other news organizations. Dart Centre Australasia works actively with journalists in Australia, New Zealand, the Philippines, Cambodia and elsewhere in the region.

References

Further reading 
 Danieli, Yael. Sharing the Front Line and the Back Hills: International Protectors and Providers : Peacekeepers, Humanitarian Aid Workers and the Media in the Midst of Crisis. Baywood Publishing Company, 2001. .
 Feinstein, Anthony. Journalists Under Fire: The Psychological Hazards of Covering War. Johns Hopkins University Press, 2006. .
 Hight, Joe and Frank Smyth. Tragedies and Journalists, Dart Center for Journalism and Trauma, 2003.
 Newman, E. & Shapiro, B. Helping Journalists Who Cover Humanitarian Crisis,  In G. Reyes (ed.). International Disaster Psychology, Vol. IV, Westport, CT: Praeger Publications, 2007. .
 Newman, E., R. Simpson and Handschuh, David, "Trauma Exposure and Post-Traumatic Stress Disorder among Photojournalists." News Photographer 58(1): 4–13, 2003; Visual Communication Quarterly (Routledge), 10(1) 4–13, January 2003, .
 Simpson, Roger and William Cote. Covering Violence: A Guide to Ethical Reporting About Victims of Trauma. Columbia University Press, 2006. .
 Simpson, Roger and Boggs, James, "An Exploratory Study of Traumatic Stress Among Newspaper Journalists", Journalism and Communication Monographs, AEJMC, Spring 1999.

External links
 

American journalism organizations